WREL (1450 AM) is a sports formatted broadcast radio station licensed to Lexington, Virginia, serving Lexington/Buena Vista area.  WREL is owned and operated by First Media Radio, LLC.

References

External links

REL
Sports radio stations in the United States
Radio stations established in 1948
1948 establishments in Virginia